Daniel Sloate (January 27, 1931 – April 10, 2009) was a Canadian translator, poet and playwright.

Sloate attended the University of Western Ontario (where he obtained a B.A. in French and English) and obtained a doctorate in French literature from the Sorbonne. He taught translation at the Translators' School in Paris before taking a position also teaching translation at the Université de Montréal, where he remained until his retirement in 1995.

Awards and recognition
 Winner: Félix-Antoine Savard Award offered by the Translation Center, Columbia University in 1991 for his translation of Selected Poems by Marie Uguay
 Nominated: 1998 Governor General's Awards, Translation (from French to English) for Aknos and Other Poems by Fulvio Caccia

Bibliography

Original works

Non-fiction
 Les Traquenards de la grammaire anglaise (with Denis G. Gauvin) (1985)

Novels
 Lydia Thrippe (1999)

Poetry
 Poems in Blue and Black (1955)
 Words in Miniature (1972)
 A Taste of Earth, A Taste of Flame (1981)
 Dead Shadows (1983)
 Of Dissonance and Shadows (2001)
 Chaque étreinte est un oubli Trad. François Peraldi (2003)

Theatre
 The Countess Plays, five one-act plays (1995)
 I Is Another (2008)

Translations
 Illuminations by Arthur Rimbaud (1971), (1990)
 First Secrets by Éloi de Grandmont (1983)
 On Mont-Courant by Serge Meyer (1985)
 The Passions of Mr. Desire by André Roy (1986)
 Selected Poems by Marie Uguay (1991)
 Black Diva by Jean-Paul Daoust (1991)
 The Life of Mozart by Stendhal (1994)
 Interviews to Literature by Jean Royer (1996)
 Impala by Carole David (1997)
 Interviews with the Phoenix by Fulvio Caccia (1998)
 Aknos and Other Poems by Fulvio Caccia (1998)
 Blue Ashes by Jean-Paul Daoust (1999)
 Selected Poems by Fulvio Caccia (2000)
 Parallel to Life by André Roy (2001)
 A Father's Revenge by Pan Bouyoucas (with George Tombs) (2001)
 Isabelle's Notebooks by Sylvie Chaput (with Peter Vranckx) (2002)
 Republic Denied: The Loss of Canada, by Fulvio Caccia (with Domenic Cusmano) (2002)
 No End to the World: Selected Poems by Hélène Dorion (2004)
 Life in the Singular: Selected Poems by Claude Beausoleil (2004)
 The Night Will Be Insistent: Selected Poems: 1987–2000 by Denise Desautels (2006)
 I'll Always Become What's Left of Me by Guillaume Bourque (2006)

External links
Sloate's web page at the League of Canadian Poets
Sloate's web page at  Guernica Editions

1931 births
2009 deaths
20th-century Canadian poets
Canadian male poets
Writers from Montreal
Writers from Windsor, Ontario
University of Paris alumni
University of Western Ontario alumni
Academic staff of the Université de Montréal
20th-century Canadian translators
20th-century Canadian male writers
Canadian male non-fiction writers